Shree J. M. Chaudhari Sarvajanik Vidyalaya is a school in Gandhinagar, Gujarat, India.

The school curriculum is based on the GSEB format of education, and has teaching facilities from Kindergarten, 1 to 12 (GSEB).

History
Shree J. M. Chaudhari Sarvajanik Vidyalaya was founded and conducted by Akhil Aajana Kelavni Mandal in 1984 in Gandhinagar, Gujarat.

School motto
सा विद्या या विमुक्तये 
Translation in English: Knowledge is one that liberates.

See also

 List of schools in Gujarat
 Education in India
 GSEB

Education in Gujarat